WLFX (106.7 FM) is a radio station  broadcasting a mix of Soft AC and AC formats.  Licensed to Berea, Kentucky, United States, the station serves the Richmond area and southern parts of the Lexington area.  The station is currently owned by Wallingford Communications, LLC and features programming from Cumulus Media Networks.

History
The station went on the air as WKXO-FM on August 23, 1990. On July 19, 1999, the station changed its call sign to the current WLFX.

References

External links
106.7 The Pinnacle Facebook

LFX
Soft adult contemporary radio stations in the United States
Mainstream adult contemporary radio stations in the United States